Hashim Saleh Mohammed Al-Balushi (born 15 October 1981), commonly known as Hashim Saleh, is an Omani footballer.

Club career

Hashim has been wearing the number 9 jersey for clubs like Al-Nasr S.C.S.C. to rivals Dhofar S.C.S.C. In 2008, he returned to Oman and signed for Al-Suwaiq Club but then later returned to Dhofar. During his brief stay at Al-Suwaiq Club, he led them to victory in the Sultan Qaboos Cup final against Al-Nahda Club. After his return to Dhofar, he again lead his club to the final but unfortunately losing to a lower-leveled Saham SC. In 2010 Hashim Saleh renewed his contract with Dhofar, extending his stay with the club for another season and then later played for them till the 2010–11 season. In 2011, he moved to Barka based club Al-Shabab Club and played for two seasons scoring 8 goals. On 27 July 2013, he signed a contract with his former club Dhofar S.C.S.C. On 13 July 2014, he signed a one-year contract with Oman First Division League side Salalah SC.

He has also played for Kuwaiti clubs like Al-Shamal Sports Club, Al-Tadamun SC and Kazma Sporting Club and has also spent a year with Al-Wakrah Sport Club of Qatar.

Club career statistics

International career

Gulf Cup of Nations
Hashim has made appearances in the 2003 Gulf Cup of Nations, the 2004 Gulf Cup of Nations, the 2007 Gulf Cup of Nations and the 2009 Gulf Cup of Nations.

He first showed his talent during the 2003 Gulf Cup of Nations, scoring a goal in a 2–0 win over the United Arab Emirates. In the tournament, Oman finished at the fourth place, hence reaching its best ever position in the Gulf Cup of Nations competition, reaching the final four round for the first time, with eight points from two wins and two draws.

In the 2007 Gulf Cup of Nations, he scored a magnificent goal in a 2–1 win over Kuwait. This goal stunned Kuwait and it was regarded by many as "the best goal in the competition". This was the second time when Oman reached to the finals but again they lost to the hosts, the United Arab Emirates. Ismail Matar, the Emirati legend, scored the lone goal of the match as United Arab Emirates won their first ever Gulf Cup of Nations.
 
Finally in 2009, he helped his team to win their first ever Gulf Cup of Nations trophy.

AFC Asian Cup Qualification
Hashim has made appearances in the 2004 AFC Asian Cup qualification, the 2004 AFC Asian Cup, the 2007 AFC Asian Cup qualification, the 2007 AFC Asian Cup and the 2011 AFC Asian Cup qualification.

He scored two goals in the 2004 AFC Asian Cup qualification, one in a 6–0 win over Nepal and another in a 3–1 win over South Korea hence helping his team to qualify for the 2004 AFC Asian Cup. In the tournament, Oman won four points in a 2–0 win over Thailand and a 2–2 draw against Iran and hence failed to qualify for the quarter-finals.

In the 2007 AFC Asian Cup qualification, he scored one goal in a 3–0 win over Jordan and again helped his team to qualify for the 2007 AFC Asian Cup. Badar Al-Maimani scored one and the only goal of Oman in the 2007 AFC Asian Cup in a 1–1 draw against Australia. In the tournament, Oman won two points in a 1–1 draw against Australia and in a 1–1 draw against Iraq and hence failed to qualify for the quarter-finals.

FIFA World Cup Qualification
Hashim has made four appearances in the 2002 FIFA World Cup qualification, four in the 2006 FIFA World Cup qualification, five in the 2010 FIFA World Cup qualification and has represented the national team in the 2014 FIFA World Cup qualification.

His only goal for Oman in FIFA World Cup qualification came in the First Round of 2010 FIFA World Cup in a 2–0 win over Nepal.

National team career statistics

Goals for senior national team
Scores and results list Oman's goal tally first.

References

External links

 
 
 Hashim Saleh at Goal.com
 
 

1981 births
Living people
Omani footballers
Oman international footballers
Omani expatriate footballers
Association football forwards
2004 AFC Asian Cup players
2007 AFC Asian Cup players
Al-Nasr SC (Salalah) players
Dhofar Club players
Al-Shamal SC players
Al-Wakrah SC players
Suwaiq Club players
Kazma SC players
Al-Shabab SC (Seeb) players
Salalah SC players
Qatar Stars League players
Oman Professional League players
Expatriate footballers in Qatar
Omani expatriate sportspeople in Qatar
Expatriate footballers in Kuwait
Omani expatriate sportspeople in Kuwait
Footballers at the 2002 Asian Games
Omani people of Baloch descent
Asian Games competitors for Oman
People from Salalah
Kuwait Premier League players